SCM may refer to:

Organizations
 SCM Corporation, an American typewriter and calculator manufacturer
 SCM Holdings, a holding company owned by Ukrainian tycoon Rinat Akhmetov
 SCM Press, a UK-based academic publisher of theology
 Securities Commission Malaysia, Malaysian statutory body
 Student Christian Movement of the United Kingdom
 Student Christian Movement (disambiguation), members of the World Student Christian Federation
 Surya Citra Media, a media company in Indonesia

Science and technology
 Structural Causal Model, a graphical modelling used for Causal Inference in Machine Learning and Statistics, a Causal Model.
 Scanning capacitance microscopy, a mode of scanning probe microscopy
 Schwarz, Corradi, Melnick, an astronomical catalogue
 Standard cubic meter, a unit of natural gas measurement
 Sternocleidomastoid muscle
 Structured Carrier Message, a component of MaxiCode
 Subcarrier multiplexing, a multiplexing method used in optical communication systems
 Master of Science (ScM)

Computing
 SCM (Scheme implementation), a free software Scheme implementation
 Service Control Manager, a component of Microsoft Windows operating systems
 Software configuration management
 Source control management or source code management, the management of documents, source code, or other data in a computing project

Other uses
 Short course meters, in swimming, a designation for competitions in 25-meter pools
 Smart Cities Mission, India
 Squadron Corporal Major, a warrant officer appointment in the British Household Cavalry
 Star Chinese Movies, a Chinese movies channel owned by Fox International Channels
 Supply chain management, management of flow of goods and services
 Sweetened condensed milk
 School of Creative Media, within City University of Hong Kong
 Set, Complete, Meteorological, a Signal Corps Radio term